The Rotary Smith Award was created in 1988 to honor the most outstanding college baseball player of the year. The award was founded by the Greater Houston Sports Association. In 1996, the Rotary Club of Houston joined the award committee. Prior to the 2004 season, the award was succeeded by the Roger Clemens Award, honoring the most outstanding college baseball pitcher.

Winners

See also

List of college baseball awards

External links
The Rotary Club of Houston

College baseball trophies and awards in the United States
College baseball player of the year awards in the United States
Rotary International
Awards established in 1988
Awards disestablished in 2004